The Siemens SD660, originally known as the Siemens SD600, is a double-articulated, 70%-low-floor light rail vehicle (LRV) manufactured by Siemens Transportation Systems. It was the first low-floor light rail vehicle to be used in the United States. It first entered service in 1997 with its only operator, TriMet, on the MAX light rail system in Portland, Oregon, United States.

History 
The initial order placed by TriMet in May 1993 was for 39 cars. It was the first order for low-floor light rail vehicles (LRVs) in North America. The order was subsequently expanded to 46 cars and ultimately to 52. TriMet received the first car, which it numbered 201, in July 1996, and the first nine cars entered service on August 31, 1997.  Siemens retroactively changed the car's model designation from SD600 to SD660, a change relating to its use of AC motors running on 60 Hz instead of DC ones, in 1998. The 52nd car was received by TriMet in April 2000.

TriMet later purchased 27 more SD660s (initially 17 cars, with another 10 added to the order in 2002), which were built between 2003 and 2005. TriMet designated these "Type 3" in its fleet and numbered them 301–327. The last car was delivered in March 2005.

All 79 SD660 cars were originally equipped with rollsign-type destination signs. TriMet replaced the original signs with LED-type signs in a two-year conversion program that lasted from fall 2014 to August 2016.

Features 

 Bridgeplate wheelchair ramps. These are located at two of the four doorways on each side of an LRV, the two closest to the car's center.
 Bi-directional (or "double-ended"), with operating cabs at both ends

References

External links 

Light rail vehicles
Siemens tram vehicles
Electric multiple units of the United States
MAX Light Rail
Train-related introductions in 1996
750 V DC multiple units